Addi Abagiè is a reservoir located in the Sa’isi Tsa’ida Imba woreda of the Tigray Region in Ethiopia. The earthen dam that holds the reservoir was built in 1993.

Dam characteristics 
Dam crest length: 176 metres. Exceptionally, among the many dams in Tigray, this dam was breached around the year 2000, due to high positioning of the spillway and hence overtopping of the dam. Around 2010 the breach was closed and the dam height increased. The dam is now operational.

Environment 
The catchment of the reservoir is 8.77 km² large, with a perimeter of 13 km and a length of 4700 metres. The reservoir suffers from rapid siltation. The lithology of the catchment is Enticho Sandstone and Precambrian metamorphic rocks.

References 

Reservoirs in Ethiopia
1993 establishments in Ethiopia
Tigray Region